Coming Back may refer to:

 Coming Back (film), directed by Lee Man-hee
 "Coming Back" (How I Met Your Mother)
 "Coming Back", by Stephen Gately from the album New Beginning
 "Comin' Back" (The Crystal Method song)